Streptomyces tritici is a bacterium species from the genus of Streptomyces which has been isolated from rhizosphere soil from the wheat-plant Triticum aestivum.

See also 
 List of Streptomyces species

References 

tritici
Bacteria described in 2018